Storhaug is a borough of the city of Stavanger which lies in the southwestern part of the large municipality of Stavanger in Rogaland county, Norway. This borough includes the traditional city centre and main harbor along the Byfjorden. It is located east of Eiganes og Våland borough and south of the island borough of Hundvåg. The  borough has a population (2016) of 16,544.

Neighbourhoods
Although the borders of "neighbourhoods" do not correspond exactly to the borough borders, Storhaug roughly consists of the following neighbourhoods: Johannes, Nylund, Varden, Paradis, Bergjeland, and Øyane.

Politics
Storhaug borough is led by a municipal borough council. The council consists of 11 members, with the following party allegiances:

References

Boroughs and neighbourhoods of Stavanger